The Conservative Women's Organisation (CWO) represents the female members of the Conservative Party in England, Wales, and Northern Ireland.

The Scottish Conservative Women's Council is the autonomous sister organisation of the CWO in Scotland. The Chairman of the British Section of the European Union of Women also sits on the CWO National Executive.

The youth wing of Conservative Women's Organisation is called Conservative Young Women.

As with all political parties, membership has declined and the CWO had about 5,000 active members in 2012 (although all the women members of the party are actually members). Attendance at the CWO Annual Conference has been between 300 and 750 in the past five years.

It also sends delegates to the National Conservative Convention, the parliament of the party's voluntary wing (Voluntary Party).

History

The National Union of Conservative and Unionist Associations' Central Women's Advisory Committee (CWAC) was formed in 1908 and officially founded in 1919, although not affiliated to the Conservative Party until 1928. Its roots go back to the Grand Ladies Council of the Primrose League of 1885. It changed its name to the Women's National Advisory Committee (WNAC) in 1951 and again to the Conservative Women's National Committee (CWNC) in April 1982. It changed to its current title in April 2007.

In the latter half of the 20th century, the CWO had more than a quarter of a million members and became the largest women's political organisation in the Western world. For several decades, the women's organisation's annual conference was regularly held in the Royal Albert Hall in London.

The CWO celebrated its centenary in 2019 at its conference at Methodist Hall in London on 9 March 2019. The organisation created a supplementary centenary logo, which includes a primrose, in reference to its roots in the Primrose League – and uses the suffragette colours of purple, white and green.

Purpose
According to its website, the CWO is:
The grassroots network that provides support and focus for women in the Conservative Party
Reaching out to women in all parts of the community
Campaigning on issues of particular concern to women both nationally and internationally
Encouraging women to be politically active and to get elected at all levels
Ensuring that the women's perspective is taken into account because women see things differently from men
Helping the Conservative Party capture the women's vote

Organisation

National Executive

The CWO Executive Committee has responsibility for the overall management of the organisation and is composed of:
CWO officers (president, chairman, 3 deputy chairmen, treasurer and deputy chairman Europe)
European Union of Women (EUW) British Section Officers
The 12 regional chairmen plus 2 additional executive members (AEMs) per region
Up to 8 co-options
Up to 8 additional members

National officers
The national officers for 2022/3  are:

Regions
 East Midlands
 Eastern
 London
 North East
 North West
 Northern Ireland
 Scotland (as Scottish Conservative Women)
 South West
 Southern
 Wales
 West Midlands
 Yorkshire
Each of the 12 regions are broken into Areas (roughly by county), with each having their own Area Chairman with responsibility to the Regional Chairmen. An affiliated (or recognised) Conservative Association women's group, known as Association CWOs or Conservative Women's Constituency Committees (CWCCs).

Affiliation and constitution
The organisation is officially affiliated to the Conservative Party.  Its last constitution was ratified by the CWO AGM in March 2007 and ratified by the Party Board on 7 April 2007.  A revised constitution was ratified by the CWO AGM on 29 March 2014 and ratified by the Party Board on 28 April 2014.

Elections
National and Regional elections take place at Annual General Meetings before 30 April each year.

Policy and research

CWO Forums
Although the organisation primarily represents the views of the women grassroots members of the Conservative Party, it is also involved in policy and research, which particularly affect women in the UK. It does this primarily through its CWO Forums – panel based discussion meetings that are generally held in the Palace of Westminster and which are open to men and women, and to people from all political persuasions.

Subjects covered in the last five years include:
 Human Trafficking 
 Sexual Exploitation
 Policing 
 'Big Brother' Syndrome 
 Animal Welfare
 Drugs 
 Immigration/Asylum 
 Environment
 Criminal Justice System 
 Food Labelling 
 Housing/Planning
 Mental Health 
 Pensions 
 Europe
 Forced Marriages 
 Prostitution 
 Gang Culture
 Iraq & Afghanistan 
 Cyber Bullying 
 Local Government
 Taxation 
 Stalking 
 Rural Poverty

CWO Development
Set up by the then chairman, Pauline Lucas, in 2010, the development programme mentors and develops women to stand for public office at all levels. Workshops are usually held at the Conservative Campaign Headquarters in London but sponsored Be a Councillor days are held around the UK. Workshops cover communication, interviews, applications, campaigns and finance, together with other "transferable skills". In July 2013, the CWO announced a new workshop as an introduction for women to apply for Public Appointments and Non-Executive Director roles.

Conferences
The first recorded Conservative Women's Conference was in 1921 and holding an annual conference is part of its constitution. For several decades, the women's organisation's annual conference was regularly held in the Royal Albert Hall.

National CWO Chairmen

References

External links
 Conservative Women's Organisation – Official Website
 ConservativeHome: New Officer Team Elected to run the CWO
 Blue Blog: Caroline Spelman – The CWO Annual Conference 2008
 Blue Blog: Theresa May – Speech to the CWO Annual Conference 2008

Organisations associated with the Conservative Party (UK)
1885 establishments in the United Kingdom
Organizations established in 1885
Women's wings of political parties in the United Kingdom